Hólger Abraham Quiñónez Caicedo (born 18 September 1962) is an Ecuadorian retired footballer who played as a central defender.

Club career
Quiñónez was born in San Carlos, Los Ríos Province. During his 20-year professional career he played for Barcelona SC (where he also retired, in 2000), Brazil's CR Vasco da Gama, C.S. Emelec, C.F. União in Portugal, Deportivo Pereira from Colombia and S.D. Quito.

Voted once the best CONMEBOL player in his position, Quiñónez briefly managed main club Barcelona in 2007.

International career
Quiñónez earned a total of 50 caps for the Ecuador national team during 15 years, and represented the country in five Copa América tournaments. He featured in seven FIFA World Cup qualification matches.

References

External links

1962 births
Living people
People from Quevedo Canton
Ecuadorian footballers
Association football defenders
Ecuadorian Serie A players
Barcelona S.C. footballers
C.S. Emelec footballers
S.D. Quito footballers
Campeonato Brasileiro Série A players
CR Vasco da Gama players
Primeira Liga players
Liga Portugal 2 players
C.F. União players
Categoría Primera A players
Deportivo Pereira footballers
Ecuador international footballers
1989 Copa América players
1991 Copa América players
1993 Copa América players
1995 Copa América players
1999 Copa América players
Ecuadorian expatriate footballers
Expatriate footballers in Brazil
Expatriate footballers in Portugal
Expatriate footballers in Colombia
Ecuadorian football managers
Barcelona S.C. managers